Melodorum fruticosum, the white cheesewood, is a plant of the Annonaceae family native to Southeast Asia. It is one of the two species considered the national flower of Cambodia. It is also the provincial flower of Sisaket province, Thailand.

Description
This plant has a cream-coloured flower with a single alternate leaf. It gives out a pleasant fragrance, especially in the evening.
It also has medical uses as a tonic and mild cardiac stimulant and hematinic.

This small tree reaches a height between 8 and 12 m. It is very common in Cambodia, where it is often planted as a decorative tree in public parks. Khmer women have been compared to the rumdul flower in ancient Cambodian literature and folklore.

In Thailand a traditional cookie called kleeb lamduan is made in the shape of the flower.

References

External links 
 
 

Annonaceae
Cambodian culture
Sisaket province
Trees of Thailand